Orocrambus aethonellus is a moth in the family Crambidae. It was described by Edward Meyrick in 1883. It is endemic to New Zealand. O. aethonellus has been recorded from the South Island. The habitat consists of sandhills and bogs at sea level, up to altitudes of about 1,200 meters.

The wingspan is 13–20 mm for males and 15–21 mm for females. Adults have been recorded on wing from late October to late January.

References

Crambinae
Moths described in 1883
Taxa named by Edward Meyrick
Endemic fauna of New Zealand
Moths of New Zealand
Endemic moths of New Zealand